Six Records of a Floating Life (Fu sheng liu ji) is an autobiography by Shen Fu (1763–1825), who lived in Changzhou (now Suzhou) during the Qing dynasty. The four extant records are "Wedded Bliss", "The Little Pleasures of Life", "Sorrow", and "The Joys of Travel". Two further "records" are lost (or perhaps were never completed): "A History of Life at Zhongshan" and "The Way of Living".

Yang Yin, the brother-in-law of the prominent writer Wang Tao, found the incomplete manuscript of the work at a stall selling second-hand books. He gave the four parts to Wang Tao, who was in charge of the Shanghai newspaper Shen Bao. Wang Tao published the manuscript in letterpress in 1877, whereupon it became an instant bestseller. The "Fourth Record" was written in 1808, so the book is believed to be finished sometime after that date. Based on the index, scholars have been able to determine that the fifth record was intended to be called "A History of Life at Chungshan" and the sixth was intended to be called "The Way of Living". The fifth and sixth sections have never been found, despite various fraudulent claims.

The phrase "floating life" (浮生 fúshēng) originates from the preface to a poem by the Tang-era poet Li Bai: "The floating life is but as a dream; how much longer can we enjoy our happiness?"

Style
The book is written in what translator Graham Sanders calls "the literary language of poetry, essays and official histories rather than in the more verbose vernacular language used for the popular lengthy novels and dramas of the Ming and Qing dynasties". According to Sanders, this choice allowed Shen Fu to "slip readily into a poetic lyrical mode," although he is also able to address topics as diverse as "gardening, finance, social roles of women, tourism, literary criticism, prostitution, class relations, and family dynamics."

Outline

The four extant records are:
 "Wedded Bliss" (閨房記樂 guīfáng jì lè, "Record of Boudoir Music"), in which the author mainly puts the focus on his wife Chen Yun, with whom Shen Fu fell in love when they were both young. Although Chen Yun is not considered beautiful, she pursues beauty in other areas. She considers painting and embroidering to be necessary to composing poetry, and regards a simple life as an ideal existence. Shen Fu considers her to be not only his wife but also his close friend who can share in his hobbies and his feelings, which was considered an unorthodox approach to marriage in Chinese society at the time.
 "The Little Pleasures of Life" (閑情記趣 xiánqíng jì qù, "Record of Leisure and Fun"), which gives a vivid description of the leisure activities enjoyed by Shen Fu: the joys of his childhood, his adult life cultivating flowers, and his experiences of composing poems with other scholars. He tended to be close to nature in childhood, but in adulthood he had very little time to focus on nature, and was often chained to worldly possessions. Many of the episodes in this section are involved with discussions of aesthetic experiences.
 "Sorrow" (坎坷記愁 kǎnkě jì chóu, "Bumpy Record of Sorrow"), in which Shen Fu points out that most of his frustrations are due to his uprightness and his commitment to words. Though this chapter opens with the author's own sorrow, its content also addresses the difficulties of Chen Yun's life; which also grows out of her character, and with the author’s endless love for his wife and his resentment over her unfair fate.
 "The Joys of Travel" (浪遊記快 làng yóujì kuài, "Quick Travel Records of Joy") portrays beautiful scenic spots that the author has visited, and records anecdotes, local customs and historical allusions. Shen Fu expounds his belief that it is the gaining of experience that counts, rather than following what others have said.

Plays

Six Records of a Floating Life has also been adapted as an experimental play by East Meets West Mime, mixing elements of mime, dance, pop, and theatre. Ballerina Lindzay Chan played the character of Chen Yun, while Philip Fok played Shen Fu.

Translations
English
 Six Chapters of a Floating Life (Shanghai, 1936) - translated by Lin Yutang
Reprinted in The Wisdom of China and India by Lin Yutang (New York: Random House, 1942)
 Chapters from a Floating Life: The Autobiography of a Chinese Artist (Oxford University Press, 1960) - translated by Shirley M. Black
 Six Records of a Floating Life (New York: Viking Press, 1983) - translated by Leonard Pratt and Su-Hui Chiang 
Also reissued by Penguin Classics
 Six Records of a Life Adrift (Indianapolis: Hackett Publishing, 2011) - translated by Graham Sanders .

German
  (Müller & Kiepenheuer, 1989) 
  (Frankfurt am Main, Wien: Büchergilde Gutenberg, 1990) - translated by Rainer Schwarz 
  (Matthes & Seitz Berlin, 2019) 

French
  (Bruxelles, Éditions F. Larcier, 1966) - translated by Pierre Ryckmans 
  (Gallimard / Unesco, 1986) - translated by Jacques Reclus

Danish
  (Omstag, 1986)

Italian
  (1955)
  (Marsilio, 1993) - translated by Lionello Lanciotti 

Korean
  (1979)

Spanish
  (1985)
  (Chindia Plataforma, 2012) 

Dutch
  (Chinaboek, 1989) - translated by Daan Bronkhorst 

Hebrew
 

Swedish
  (1961)

Japanese
 

Malaysian
  (Oxford University Press, 1961)

Czech
  (1944)

Russian
  (Moscow, 1979) - translated by Kirina Ivanovna Golygina

Vietnamese
  (Hà Nội, 2018) - translated by Châu Hải Đường 

Polish
  (2019) - translated by Katarzyna Sarek

References

Chinese-language books
Chinese autobiographies
Qing dynasty literature
1878 non-fiction books